USS Morris may refer to the following ships of the United States Navy:

, was a ship in service from 1778 until wrecked in 1779
, was a schooner acquired in 1779 which operated on the Mississippi River during the American Revolutionary War
, was a schooner in service from early 1846 until wrecked in October 1846
, was a schooner in service from 1846 to 1848
, was a torpedo boat commissioned in 1898 and decommissioned in 1919
, was a  commissioned in 1919 and decommissioned in 1922
, was a  commissioned in 1940 and decommissioned in 1945
, was a patrol craft commissioned as USS PC-1179 in 1943, decommissioned in 1946, renamed Morris in 1956, and struck from the Navy List in 1960

See also
 , a Union Navy ferryboat during the American Civil War
 
 
 
 Mr. Morris, ex-USS AFDM-2, an auxiliary floating drydock in Port Arthur, Texas

United States Navy ship names